UKTV Play is a video on demand service owned by UKTV, launched in August 2014. The service offers catch-up programming from UKTV's free-to-air channels, which are Dave, Drama, W and Yesterday.

UKTV Play was first announced in June 2014. The service first launched on iOS in August, on PC, YouView and Virgin Media in November and on Android in February 2015. In addition, it launched on Freeview Play in August 2016, on Roku and Now in February 2018, and on Freesat and Samsung smart TVs in September 2018.

Following the addition of W to UKTV's free-to-air packages, the shows from the channel became available to watch for free on UKTV Play.

References

External links

Internet properties established in 2014
Video on demand services
2014 establishments in the United Kingdom
UKTV